The Briefcase is an American reality TV program created by Dave Broome that premiered on CBS on May 27, 2015. In each episode, two American families undergoing financial hardship are each given a briefcase containing $101,000, and must decide whether to keep all the money for themselves or give some or all of it to the other family. Over the course of 72 hours, each family learns about the other and makes the decision, without knowing that the other family has been given a briefcase as well, with the same instructions. On December 9, 2015, the show was cancelled.

Reception of The Briefcase has been largely negative. Ken Tucker, critic-at-large of Yahoo! TV, described it as "cynical and repulsive" for "passing off its exploitation...as uplifting, inspirational TV." Jason Miller of Time.com called it "the worst reality TV show ever". Others compared the show to fictional film and television that pitted the needy against each other, such as the Twilight Zone episode "Button, Button", or The Hunger Games.

Executive producer David Broome responded that critics were misrepresenting the show. "Some of the reports are factually incorrect to the point of irresponsible journalism," he said.

Episodes

Ratings

International version
An Australian version of the show aired on the Nine Network from June 20 until August 9, 2016. Much like the American program, it was met with negative reviews and low ratings.

References

External links
 

2015 American television series debuts
2015 American television series endings
2010s American reality television series
CBS original programming
Television series by Sony Pictures Television